Zenonia anax is a butterfly in the family Hesperiidae. It is found in the Democratic Republic of the Congo (Shaba), south-western Tanzania, Malawi and central and northern Zambia.

References

Hesperiinae
Butterflies of Africa
Lepidoptera of the Democratic Republic of the Congo
Lepidoptera of Malawi
Lepidoptera of Tanzania
Lepidoptera of Zambia
Butterflies described in 1937